Bellara may refer to:
 Bellara, Queensland
 Bellara, Tumkur, Karnataka, India in Tumkur district